The oak forest salamander (Bolitoglossa cuchumatana) is a species of salamander in the family Plethodontidae.
It is endemic to Guatemala.
Its natural habitat is subtropical or tropical moist montane forests.
It is threatened by habitat loss.

References

Amphibians described in 1943
Bolitoglossa
Endemic fauna of Guatemala
Amphibians of Guatemala
Taxonomy articles created by Polbot